Mycoamaranthus is a genus of fungi in the family Boletaceae. The genus contains three species, found in Australasia, Africa, and Southeast Asia.

The genus was circumscribed by Michael Angelo Castellano, James 'Jim' Martin Trappe and Nicholas Malajczuk in Austral. Syst. Bot. vol.5 (5) on page 613  1992.

The genus name of Mycoamaranthus is in honour of Michael P. Amaranthus (fl. 1996-2012), who was an American botanist (mycology) and research biologist. He worked at the Forestry Sciences Laboratory in Seattle.

Species
As accepted by Species Fungorum;
 Mycoamaranthus auriorbis 
 Mycoamaranthus cambodgensis 
 Mycoamaranthus congolensis

References

External links

Boletaceae
Boletales genera
Taxa named by James Trappe